Disha Vakani (born 17 August), is an Indian film and television actress. She was known for playing the role of Daya Jethalal Gada on the sitcom Taarak Mehta Ka Ooltah Chashmah.

Early life 
Disha Vakani was born in a Gujarati family in Ahmedabad, Gujarat. She graduated in Dramatics from Gujarat College, Ahmedabad.

Career 

She started her career as a stage actress in Gujarati theatre and has starred in plays like Kamal Patel v/s Dhamal Patel and Lali Lila. She has played supporting roles in Hindi films like Devdas (2002) and Jodhaa Akbar (2008). She has played the lead role of Dayaben Gada in SAB TV's sitcom Taarak Mehta Ka Ooltah Chashmah since 2008. Her brother Mayur Vakani also plays her on-screen brother Sundarlal or Sundar. She went on maternity leave in September 2017 and did not return back. She was never seen on Television or Social media after leaving the Show.

Personal life
She married a Mumbai-based chartered accountant named Mayur Padia on 24 November 2015. On 27 November 2017, the couple became parents to a baby girl. On 24 May 2022 , the couple became parents again to a baby boy.

Filmography

Films

Television

Awards

References

External links

 

Living people
Actresses from Ahmedabad
Indian film actresses
Indian television actresses
Indian soap opera actresses
Indian stage actresses
Actresses in Gujarati cinema
Actresses in Hindi television
21st-century Indian actresses
Year of birth missing (living people)
Gujarati people